Gaden Crawford MacKenzie  (22 January 1837 - 20 March 1920) was an Anglican priest, most notably Archdeacon of Perth, ON from 1905 to 1920.

MacKenzie was educated at Trinity College, Toronto and ordained in 1870. He served at Haliburton, Galt, Chatham, Kincardine and Grace Church, Brantford.

References

19th-century Canadian Anglican priests
20th-century Canadian Anglican priests
Archdeacons of Perth, ON
Trinity College (Canada) alumni
1920 deaths
1837 births